The 1963 Soviet Football Championship (Class B) was the thirteenth season since creation of Class B in 1950 in place of the Vtoraya Gruppa. At the same time, in 1963 the Class B tournament was shifted one tier down in the Soviet league system. In this way the third level competitions were revived for the first time since 1937.

The structure of the tournament was preserved having separate competitions for Russia, Ukraine, and other Soviet republics.

Russian SFSR 
The Russian Republican competition consisted of five zones of 20 clubs. The top two teams from each zone advanced to semi-final stage composed of two groups with five teams in each. The top two teams from those two groups advanced to final stage with a single group of four.

The winner Volga Kalinin was promoted.

Semifinals

Grozny group

Saratov group

Finals

Ukrainian SSR 

The Ukrainian Republican competition consisted of two zones of 20 clubs. Upon conclusion of the league format each club qualified for a playoff with another club that placed the same place in the other group. The pair of the first placed clubs was sort of a republican championship playoff. The playoffs consisted of two legs - home and away. Note teams were relegated or withdrawn and only one was promoted to the Subgroup A (the First League).

Play-offs 
Each team played against the same ranking team from the other zone. Only the two top pairs that really mattered concerning promotion are listed next. No teams were relegated. SKA Odessa obtained the promotion from the Ukraine zone. They were classified as the Republican champions and were promoted to the Inter-Republican level, the Class A.

 FC Lokomotiv Vinnitsa - SKA Odessa 0:2 0:1
 FC Azovstal Zhdanov - SKA Lvov 0:0 1:0
 FC Zirka Kirovograd - FC Torpedo Kharkov 1:1 0:2
 FC Burevestnik Melitopol - FC Polesie Zhitomir 1:0 1:3
 FC Avangard Ternopol - FC Shakhter Gorlovka 1:1 0:0
 FC Kolgospnik Cherkassy - FC Khimik Severodonetsk 2:1 0:2
 FC Lokomotiv Donetsk - SKA Kiev 0:2 1:2
 FC Stroitel Kherson - FC Shakhter Kadeevka 3:2 0:2
 FC Dynamo Khmelnitskiy - FC Kolgospnik Poltava 5:1 0:1
 FC Arsenal Kiev - FC Dneprovets Dneprodzerzhinsk 3:2 1:2
 FC Desna Chernigov - FC Metallurg Kommunarsk 3:1 1:2
 SCF Sevastopol - FC Spartak Ivano-Frankovsk 2:1 1:4
 FC Verkhovina Uzhgorod - FC Trubnik Nikopol 0:0 1:2
 FC Avangard Zheltye Vody - FC Sudostroitel Nikolaev 1:1 1:0
 FC Avangard Chernovtsy - SC Tavriya Simferopol 6:0 0:1
 FC Avangard Kramatorsk - FC Shakhter Aleksandriya 1:1 0:2
 FC Volyn Lutsk - FC Gornyak Krivoy Rog 0:0 0:3
 FC Kolgospnik Rovno - FC Metallurg Yenakievo 3:1 2:2
 FC Metallurg Kerch - FC Neftyanik Drogobich 0:1 0:0
 FC Dnepr Kremenchug - FC Spartak Sumy 0:0 0:2

Soviet Republics 
Promoted Lokomotiv Tbilisi and Dynamo Tallinn.

See also 
 Soviet Second League

Soviet Second League seasons
3
Soviet
Soviet
Football Championship of the Ukrainian SSR